The 1982 Montreal municipal election took place on November 14, 1982, to elect a mayor and city councillors in Montreal, Quebec, Canada. Longtime mayor Jean Drapeau was re-elected for what turned out to be his final term in office, defeating challenger Jean Doré.

Elections were also held in Montreal's suburban communities in November 1982. Most suburban elections were held on November 7.

Results
Mayor

Council (incomplete)

Party colours do not indicate affiliation with or resemblance to a provincial or a federal party.

Information about the candidates
Municipal Action Group
Gino Gentile (Jean-Talon) was a first-time candidate.
Independents
Nicola L. Corbo (Jean-Talon) was a first-time candidate.

Results in suburban communities

Dorval

Source: Montreal Gazette, November 8, 1982, A6.

Montréal-Nord

Sources: Montreal Gazette, 6 November 1982, A6; Montreal Gazette, 8 November 1982, A6.

Saint-Leonard

subsequent by-elections

Information about the candidates in suburban communities

Saint-Leonard
Équipe du renouveau de la cité de Saint-Léonard
Pierre Paquet (Ward Ten) was a Montreal lawyer during the 1980s. He was elected to council in 1982 in his first bid for public office. When the Équipe du renouveau dissolved in 1984, he joined Raymond Renaud's Ralliement de Saint-Léonard, but was dropped from that party's list before 1986 election amid disputed circumstances. Renaud said that Paquet had been largely inactive on council, while Paquet said he had been blocked for asking too many serious questions.
Union municipale de Saint-Léonard
Eduardo di Bennardo (Ward Six) was elected to the Saint-Leonard city council in 1978 as a candidate of the Parti de l'alliance municipale. He was defeated in 1982, running for Union municipal.
Claude Beriault (Ward Ten) appears to have been a first-time candidate.

Results in other Montreal-area communities

Longueuil
Jacques Finet of the Parti municipal de Longueuil was elected to his first term as mayor, defeating incumbent Marcel Robidas from the Parti civique de Longueuil. The Parti municipal also won fifteen council seats, as against four for the Parti civique.

Winning candidates are listed in boldface.

Source: Le Parti municipal de Longueuil: Le premier mandat 1978 - 1982, Société historique et culturelle du Marigot, accessed January 22, 2014.

References

1982 Quebec municipal elections
Municipal elections in Montreal
1980s in Montreal
1982 in Quebec